The Virgin and Child is a 1496-1499 oil on panel painting by Cima da Conegliano, bought in 1858 by the National Gallery, London, where it still hangs.

Variants
The painter usually produced unique compositions, but this work belongs to a group of at least five he produced from a single cartoon:

References

1490s paintings
London 1496
Collections of the National Gallery, London